Jormasjärvi is a lake in Sotkamo, eastern Finland. It is part of the Oulujoki basin, which drains west to the Bothnian Bay.

The area of the lake is 20.5 km2, and maximum depth 28 m.

See also
List of lakes in Finland

Oulujoki basin
Lakes of Sotkamo